Teresa K. Woodruff is an American medical researcher in human reproduction and oncology, with a focus on ovarian biology, endocrinology, and women's health. She joined Michigan State University as the Provost and Executive Vice President for Academic Affairs in August 2020. Woodruff became the interim President of Michigan State University on November 4, 2022 after the resignation of Samuel L. Stanley. She was previously the Thomas J. Watkins Memorial Professor and Vice Chair for Research and Chief of the Division of Reproductive Science in Medicine in the Department of Obstetrics and Gynecology at the Feinberg School of Medicine at Northwestern University in Chicago, Illinois. Woodruff was Dean of the Graduate School and Professor in the McCormick School of Engineering at Northwestern University in Evanston, Illinois as well. She is credited with coining the term oncofertility and founded the Oncofertility Consortium at Northwestern Memorial Hospital. She is also founder and chief of the Division of Fertility Preservation and founder and director of the Women's Health Research Institute at Northwestern University.

Education 
Woodruff graduated with a Bachelor of Science degree in Zoology and Chemistry from the Olivet Nazarene University in 1985. She was awarded the "O" Award in 2016, presented "to honor alumni who exhibit the characteristics and ideals of their alma mater." She completed her graduate study at Northwestern University, receiving a Ph.D. in Molecular Biology and Cell Biology in 1989.

Career

Ovarian biology research
In 1986, as a graduate student in the laboratory of Kelly Mayo at Northwestern University, Woodruff cloned the protein subunits that form the peptide hormones inhibin and activin. This work was recognized in 2000 by the Endocrine Society Weitzman Award, which is presented to "an exceptionally promising young clinical or basic investigator who has not reached the age of 50."  After completing her doctorate in 1989, Woodruff completed a postdoctoral fellowship at Genentech, Inc in South San Francisco, CA, where she contributed to the development of inhibin and activin assays, which are used today for the diagnosis of Down syndrome and to measure the ovarian reserve. She is named as inventor on five patents based on her work at Genentech. Woodruff also continued her research into the physiology of inhibin and activin in pituitary and ovarian function in rodent and the effects of recombinant human inhibin and activin in primates.

Woodruff returned to Northwestern University as a faculty member in 1995 to study inhibin and activin actions and interactions within the pituitary-gonadal axis, characterizing the regulation of subunit assembly and ligand processing in the ovary, the ligands’ role in paracrine regulation of folliculogenesis, and their signal transduction pathways in the regulation of follicle-stimulating hormone (FSH). In collaboration with Theodore Jardetzky, she solved the crystal structures of activin with its receptor and with its bioneutralizing binding protein follistatin. In 2015, her lab used in silico methods to design small molecule activin antagonists based on the structure of activin bound to its receptor.

Using single-cell elemental analytical methods at the Argonne National Laboratory in collaboration with inorganic chemist Tom O’Halloran, Woodruff discovered a role of zinc in the regulation of oocyte maturation and at the moment of fertilization. Using single-cell x-ray fluorescence, Woodruff and O’Halloran described the phenomenon of the "zinc spark," an event during which 10 billion zinc ions are lost from the egg. The discovery of the zinc spark was named as one of Discover magazine's top 100 stories of 2016.

Oncofertility research

At Northwestern University, Woodruff led a highly collaborative effort that resulted in the development of a hydrogel that acts as a 3-dimensional support system for encapsulated in vitro culture of the ovarian follicle and its enclosed maturing oocyte (eIVFG). Live births in mice resulted from these studies, and this work was named as he most important breakthrough of the decade 1998-2008 by Nature Medicine. eIVFG methods were subsequently used to develop and test a microfluidic system that supports 28-day reproductive cycles ex vivo—an "ovarian cycle in a dish." On March 28, 2017, her team announced the creation of Evatar, a miniaturized female reproductive tract composed of ovarian follicles or intact ovaries (mouse) interconnected with human explants from fallopian tubes, uterus, and cervix with liver organoids to provide a metabolic management tissue system. Woodruff and team also recently created decellularized and 3D-printed ovarian bioprosthetics as replacement organs for women who have lost gonadal function. The development of an ovarian bioprosthetic was named as one of Discover magazine's 100 most important discoveries of 2018, and was recognized as a top five medical breakthrough by the Chinese Academy of Science. Her work to bridge the basic sciences and medicine was recognized with a Halo Award in 2018.

In 2006, Woodruff introduced the term oncofertility to describe the application of her work to meeting the fertility needs of young cancer patients and she has "been at the center of the movement ever since." With a $21.5-million National Institutes of Health Interdisciplinary Roadmap Grant awarded in 2007, she launched the Oncofertility Consortium, an interdisciplinary team of oncologists, fertility specialists, social scientists, educators, and policy makers dedicated to the clinical care of women at risk of losing their fertility because of cancer treatment. As part of the Oncofertility Consortium, Dr. Woodruff helped form the National Physicians Cooperative (NPC) to facilitate sharing of fertility preservation protocols and techniques between reproductive endocrinology practices and ensure that clinicians and patients receive up-to-date information about available treatment options.

Educational work
Woodruff was named director of the newly formed Institute for Women’s Health Research at Northwestern University, where she spearheads advocacy and education on sex equity in biomedical research, the attrition of women from STEM fields, and the need for greater knowledge of basic science concepts among patients. Her call for sex equity in clinical trials was the subject of a 2014 interview with Lesley Stahl on 60 Minutes.

Woodruff also created the Women’s Health Science Program (WHSP) for High School Girls & Beyond to provide science education programs to 9th -12th grade female students in Chicago Public Schools. WHSP runs four academies: the Oncofertility Saturday Academy (OSA), Cardiology Summer Academy (CSA), Infectious Disease Summer Academy (IDSA), and Physical Science Weekend Academy (PSWA). For this work, Dr. Woodruff was awarded the Presidential Award for Excellence in Science, Mathematics, and Engineering Mentoring in an Oval Office ceremony in 2011.

Woodruff created a series of videos for 8- to 12-year-olds covering topics such as puberty, menstruation, and anatomy; a MOOC for college students on reproductive health; and the Repropedia, a dictionary of reproductive science and health terms, created and updated by science and clinician contributors, for links to websites and social media to ensure accurate understanding of key terms by the public.

In 2015, Dr. Woodruff was named the Director of the Center for Reproductive Science at Northwestern University. In 2016, she founded the Masters of Science in Reproductive Science and Medicine program within the Center.

Woodruff joined Michigan State University in August of 2020. She was hired as the new provost and executive vice president for academic affairs. She was appointed interim president on October 31, 2022 and would assume the position after outgoing president Samuel L. Stanley Jr. stepped down on January 11, 2023. Stanley stepped down from the position early on November 4, 2022 and Woodruff took over as interim president.

Awards and recognition 
Woodruff holds 10 U.S. Patents. In 2017, she received a Guggenheim Award and was elected to the National Academy of Inventors. She was elected as a fellow to the National Academy of Medicine in 2018. Woodruff is also an elected Fellow of the American Association for the Advancement of Science in 2005 as well as the American Institute for Medical and Biological Engineering in 2017.

Service 
Woodruff has served on the school board of the Chicago-based Young Women’s Leadership Charter School and as president of The Endocrine Society, and was selected as Editor-in-Chief of the journal Endocrinology in September 2017. Dr. Woodruff has also served with the Economic Club of Chicago since 2015 and as a member of the Board of Trustees of the Adler Planetarium since 2018.

References

External links 

 

Living people
Olivet Nazarene University alumni
Northwestern University faculty
American oncologists
Women oncologists
20th-century American scientists
20th-century American women scientists
21st-century American scientists
21st-century American women scientists
Year of birth missing (living people)
American scientists
American women academics
Members of the National Academy of Medicine